John Rowe (20 March 1936 - 9 November 2017) was an Australian author who wrote numerous war novels about his experiences in the Vietnam War.

Early life and military
John Rowe, a former professional career soldier, was educated at Sydney Grammar School and was a 1957 graduate of the Royal Military College, Duntroon. Rowe started his active military service in 1958 fighting in four wars, including the Malayan Emergency, Kashmir, Borneo, and Vietnam War.  Promoted to Major, by 1968 Maj. John Rowe served as an exchange officer with the American Defense Intelligence Agency and served with the 173rd Airborne Brigade Combat Team and the 1st Australian Task Force.

Author
Over the course of his career, Rowe wrote six published novels and a Time-Life history book on Australian soldiers in the Vietnam War. 
In 1968, Maj. John Rowe wrote his first novel on the Vietnam War while serving in Washington, D.C. with the Defense Intelligence Agency. The book "Count Your Dead" was published by Angus & Robertson. An article on Rowe's book written by John Miles called "Soldier’s Bitter Vietnam Book" was later published in a 16 August 1968 newspaper article for The Adelaide Advertiser in Australia.
In 2003, "Count Your Dead" was selected by the Sydney University Press for inclusion in their Classic Works series of 25 books by Australian authors both living and dead.
In 2012, The Australian beat writer Peter Pierce wrote an article on Rowe's book "Count Your Dead" called "Kill by Kill, Name by Name".  Pierce states that Rowe condemned the vacillations and complacency of Australian politics including the foreign relations and the dependence on its major allies. Rowe resigned from the army after the book was published and returned to Australia.
Author John Rowe is an author entry in reference book "Who’s Who of Australian Writers"  and Oxford Companions book series; the 2nd Edition of "The Oxford Companion to Australian Literature"

Published books 
 Count Your Dead (1968) Publisher: Angus & Robertson 
 McCabe PM (1972) Publisher Collins 
 The Chocolate Crucifix (1972) Publisher Wren 
 The Warlords (1978) Publisher Angus & Robertson 
 The Aswan Solution (1979) Publisher: Knopf Doubleday 
 The Jewish Solution (1980) Publisher: Henry Holt and Company Rinehart & Winston - 
 Long Live the King (1984) Publisher Stein & Day 
  Long Live the King (1984) Publisher Rigby 
 Vietnam, the Australian experience (1987) Publisher Time-Life

References

External links
Bibliography at the National Library of Australia

1936 births
2017 deaths
Australian writers
Australian military personnel of the Vietnam War
Royal Military College, Duntroon graduates